Nicholas Hamilton (born 16 March 1996) is a Jamaican professional footballer who plays as a winger for Jamaican club Harbour View.

Club career

Cavalier
Hamilton began his career with Cavalier SC in the National Premier League in 2014, and played over 100 league games with the side over 6 years, scoring 21 goals, including 10 goals in the 2018-19 season and 5 goals during the 2019-20 before the season's cancellation. In 2016–17 in the KSAFA Super League, Hamilton scored three goals an route to an immediate re-promotion to the National Premier League for Cavalier.

York United
In February 2020, Hamilton signed a multi-year deal with Canadian Premier League side York United (known as York9 until December). Due to restrictions put in place due to the COVID-19 pandemic, Hamilton was unable to enter Canada to join the club for the 2020 season. In September 2020, Hamilton went on loan to Scottish Championship side Dundee. He first had to complete the required 14 day quarantine for travelers form outside of the country due to the pandemic, officially joining the club for training on 12 October, just days before their first league match. Hamilton made his debut for Dundee late on in a League Cup game against Cove Rangers, which Dundee would win 3–0. He scored his first goal in an exhibition match against Forfar Athletic on 9 December 2020. He was recalled from his loan on 1 June 2021. On July 10, Hamilton made his York United debut against Pacific FC, subbing on for Diyaeddine Abzi in the 80th minute of a 3-0 defeat. In December 2021, York announced they had declined Hamilton's contract option.

Harbour View 
In 2022, Hamilton returned to Jamaica with National Premier League side Harbour View, making his debut on March 12 against Vere United. He would score two key goals for the club in both legs of the league play-off semi-finals against Waterhouse. Hamilton would score a penalty in a shootout victory which crowned Harbour View as National Premier League champions, their first league title since 2013. In January 2023, Hamilton was awarded the People's Choice Award at the RJR/Gleaner National Sportsperson Awards for his semi-final goal against Waterhouse.

International career
On the international level, Hamilton received a call-up for the Jamaica national football team in 2019, but has yet to make his first appearance for the Reggae Boyz.

In August 2022, Hamilton would be named as part of the Reggae Boyz squad to take part in a friendly tournament at the Ernst-Happel-Stadion in Vienna, Austria. Hamilton made his international debut in a friendly against Qatar on 26 August.

Personal life 
He attended Holy Trinity school in Jamaica. He is also referred to by the name "Kumi".

Career Statistics

International

Honours

Club 
Cavalier

 KSAFA Super League: 2016–17

Dundee

 Scottish Premiership play-offs: 2020–21

Harbour View

 National Premier League: 2022

Individual 

 2022 RJR/Gleaner National Sportsman of the Year - People's Choice Award

References 

1996 births
Living people
Association football forwards
Jamaican footballers
Sportspeople from Kingston, Jamaica
Jamaican expatriate footballers
Expatriate soccer players in Canada
Jamaican expatriate sportspeople in Canada
Expatriate footballers in Scotland
Jamaican expatriate sportspeople in Scotland
Cavalier F.C. players
York United FC players
Dundee F.C. players
National Premier League players
Canadian Premier League players
Harbour View F.C. players
Jamaica international footballers